Ignazio Lupi (1867–1942) was an Italian actor and film director. Lupi appeared in more than eighty films including several historical epics such as Cabiria (1914).

Selected filmography
 Quo Vadis (1913)
 Antony and Cleopatra (1913)
 Cabiria (1914)
 The Rose of Granada (1916)
 The Sheep (1920)
 But It Isn't Serious (1921)
 The Fiery Cavalcade (1925)

References

Bibliography 
 Cowie, Peter. Seventy Years of Cinema. A.S. Barnes, 1969.

External links 
 

1867 births
1942 deaths
Italian male film actors
Italian male silent film actors
Male actors from Rome
20th-century Italian male actors